80 Degrees East of Birdland is a 2000 Norwegian short film directed by Sølvi A. Lindseth. It follows an American Jazz ensemble as they get stranded on a farm in rural Norway. The old man who lives there believes they have come to take him away to a retirement home.

External links
 

2000 films
2000 short films
Norwegian short films